Padma Shri Award, India's fourth highest civilian honours – Winners, 2000 – 2009

Recipients

Explanatory notes

Non-citizen recipients

Posthumous recipients

References

External links
 
 

Recipients of the Padma Shri
Lists of Indian award winners
2000s in India
2000s-related lists